The Columbine effect is the legacy and impact of the 1999 Columbine High School massacre. The shooting has had an effect on school safety, policing tactics, prevention methods (including gun control and metal detectors), and inspired numerous copycat crimes, with many killers taking their inspiration from Eric Harris and Dylan Klebold by describing the two perpetrators as being martyrs or heroes.

The shooting has also had a significant impact on popular culture, with Harris and Klebold often seen and mentioned in several forms of media.

Background

On April 20, 1999, Columbine High School seniors Eric Harris and Dylan Klebold murdered 12 students and one teacher then injured 24 others. Around 50 minutes after the shooting began, Harris and Klebold took their own lives in the library, where the majority of their victims died. It was at the time, the deadliest shooting at a high school in American history. The shooting was the most covered news story of 1999, and third most followed by the American public of the entire decade, surpassing the death of John F. Kennedy Jr and the Kosovo War.

Effects on schools
Following the Columbine shooting, schools across the United States instituted new security measures such as transparent backpacks, metal detectors, school uniforms, and security guards. Some schools implemented the numbering of school doors to improve public safety response. Several schools throughout the country resorted to requiring students to wear computer-generated IDs.

Schools also adopted a zero-tolerance approach to possession of weapons and threatening behavior by students.
Despite the effort, several social science experts feel the zero tolerance approach adopted in schools has been implemented too harshly, with unintended consequences creating other problems. Despite the safety measures that were implemented in the wake of the tragedy at Columbine, school shootings continued to take place in the United States. Virginia Tech, Sandy Hook, Stoneman Douglas, and Robb were four subsequent school shootings that far surpassed the casualties of the 1999 massacre, subsequently raising concern of gun violence in the United States.

Some schools renewed existing anti-bullying policies. Rachel's Challenge was started by victim Rachel Scott's parents, and lectures schools about bullying and suicide.

Police tactics
Police departments have reassessed their tactics and have since trained for Columbine-like situations after criticism over the slow response and progress of the SWAT teams during the shooting. Sheriff Stone did not seek reelection.

Police followed a traditional tactic at Columbine: surround the building, set up a perimeter, and contain the damage. That approach has been replaced by a tactic known as the Immediate Action Rapid Deployment tactic. This tactic calls for a team to advance into the site of any ongoing shooting, but even with just a single officer if more are not available. In fact, the majority of active shooters are stopped by a single officer. Police officers using this tactic are trained to move toward the sound of gunfire in formation and neutralize the shooter as quickly as possible. There has been widespread adoption of high-strength body armor and patrol rifles by police departments across the United States in response to the increased active shooter threat. Their goal is to stop the shooter at all costs; they are to walk past wounded victims, as the aim is to prevent the shooter from killing or wounding more. Dave Cullen has stated: "The active protocol has proved successful at numerous shootings...At Virginia Tech alone, it probably saved dozens of lives."

Influence on other shootings
The Columbine shootings influenced subsequent school shootings, with several such plots mentioning it. Fear of copycats has sometimes led to the closing of entire school districts. According to psychiatrist Edwin Fuller Torrey of the Treatment Advocacy Center, a legacy of the Columbine shootings is its "allure to disaffected youth." Ralph Larkin examined twelve major school shootings in the US in the following eight years and found that in eight of those, "the shooters made explicit reference to Harris and Klebold." Larkin wrote that the Columbine massacre established a "script" for shootings. "Numerous post-Columbine rampage shooters referred directly to Columbine as their inspiration; others attempted to supersede the Columbine shootings in body count.

A 2015 investigation by CNN identified "more than 40 people...charged with Columbine-style plots." A 2014 investigation by ABC News identified "at least 17 attacks and another 36 alleged plots or serious threats against schools since the assault on Columbine High School that can be tied to the 1999 massacre." Ties identified by ABC News included online research by the perpetrators into the Columbine shooting, clipping news coverage and images of Columbine, explicit statements of admiration of Harris and Klebold, such as writings in journals and on social media, in video posts, and in police interviews, timing planned to an anniversary of Columbine, plans to exceed the Columbine victim counts, and other ties.

In 2015, journalist Malcolm Gladwell writing in The New Yorker magazine proposed a threshold model of school shootings in which Harris and Klebold were the triggering actors in "a slow-motion, ever-evolving riot, in which each new participant's action makes sense in reaction to and in combination with those who came before."

FBI former profiler Mary Ellen O'Toole said on CNN during the 20th anniversary of the massacre in 2019, and during the manhunt of Florida teenager Sol Pais, that she opposed the release of the Basement Tapes because of the call made by Eric Harris to other would-be shooters to "join him in infamy". She also highlighted that it was most likely males to be obsessed by the shooting and that the case of Sol Pais was rare due to her being a female.

Copycats
The first copycat may have been the W. R. Myers High School shooting, just eight days after Columbine, when a 14-year-old Canadian student went into his former school in Taber, Alberta at lunchtime with a sawed-off .22 rifle under his dark blue trench coat, and opened fire, killing one student. A month after the massacre, Heritage High School in Conyers, Georgia, had a shooting which Attorney General Janet Reno called a Columbine "copycat". A friend of Harris and Klebold, Eric Veik, was arrested after threatening to "finish the job" at Columbine High School in October 1999.

In 2001, Charles Andrew Williams, the perpetrator of the Santana High School shooting, reportedly told his friends that he was going to "pull a Columbine," though none of them took him seriously. In 2005, Jeff Weise, who also wore a trench coat, killed his grandfather, who was a police officer, and his girlfriend. He took his grandfather's weapon and his squad car, and drove to his former high school in Red Lake and murdered several students before killing himself. In an apparent reference to Columbine, he asked one student if they believed in God.

The perpetrator of the Dawson College shooting wrote a note praising Harris and Klebold. Convicted students Brian Draper and Torey Adamcik of Pocatello High School in Idaho, who murdered their classmate Cassie Jo Stoddart, mentioned Harris and Klebold in their homemade videos, and were reportedly planning a "Columbine-like" shooting. The perpetrator of the Emsdetten school shooting praised Harris in his diary.

In November 2007, Pekka-Eric Auvinen imitated Columbine with a shooting in Jokela in Tuusula, Finland. Prior to the shooting, he had used the nickname "NaturalSelector89" online, was interested in American school shootings, and wore a shirt which said "Humanity is Overrated".
In December 2007, a man killed two at a Youth with a Mission center in Arvada, Colorado and another two at the New Life Church in Colorado Springs before killing himself. He quoted Harris prior to the attack under the heading "Christianity is YOUR Columbine".

In a self-made video recording sent to the news media by Seung-Hui Cho prior to his committing the Virginia Tech shootings, he referred to the Columbine massacre as an apparent motivation. In the recording, he wore a backwards baseball cap and 
referred to Harris and Klebold as "martyrs." Adam Lanza, the perpetrator of the Sandy Hook Elementary School shooting, had "an obsession with mass murders, in particular, the April 1999 shootings at Columbine High School in Colorado."

In 2011, Tristan van der Vlis shot and killed six people in a shopping mall in Alphen aan den Rijn in the Netherlands before committing suicide. He was obsessed with the Columbine shootings. The date he chose for his attack was April 9, which was the birthday of Eric Harris, and he started shooting at 12:08 pm, the time when Harris committed suicide.

In June 2014, a married couple, Jerad and Amanda Miller, shot and killed two Las Vegas police officers and an intervening civilian before being confronted by police. Jerad Miller was fatally shot by an officer while Amanda Miller committed suicide shortly afterwards. They both talked about committing "the next Columbine" and idolized Harris and Klebold according to a neighbor's account.

The Tumblr fandom gained widespread media attention in February 2015 after three of its members conspired to commit a mass shooting at a Halifax mall on Valentine's Day. In 2017, two 15-year-old school boys from Northallerton, England, were charged with conspiracy to murder after becoming infatuated with the crime and "hero-worshipping" Harris and Klebold.

The 2018 Santa Fe High School shooting, in which ten people were killed, strongly resembled the Columbine massacre; the perpetrator, Dimitrios Pagourtzis, used a pump-action shotgun and homemade explosives, wore similar clothing as Harris and Klebold (including a black trench coat and combat boots) and reportedly yelled "Surprise!" to a victim during the shooting, a possible reference to the library massacre at Columbine. The Kerch Polytechnic College massacre appears to be a copycat crime. The shooter wore a white shirt which said "Hatred" (in Russian), one fingerless glove, planted bombs, and committed suicide with a shotgun in the library, all very similar to Harris' outfit and suicide.

In September 2021, two teens were arrested in Lee County, Florida, and were accused of plotting a school shooting. A search conducted of the teen's homes showed a map of the school with security cameras labeled. Several knives and a gun were also found. The Sheriff Department said the teens had a "particular interest in Columbine" and that they had been ordered to undergo mental evaluation before possible charges being filed. Additionally four teenagers were charged in Pennsylvania, after a police investigation found detailed evidence of a plan to target Dunmore High School outside of Scranton, Pennsylvania, on April 20, 2022, the 23rd anniversary of the attack. Text messages between the students planning the attack, claiming "dibs" on certain potential victims, and that they wanted "everything to go down like Columbine".

In August 2022, the perpetrator of the 2022 Bend, Oregon shooting wrote in an online manifesto he was partially influenced by the Columbine massacre.

List of alleged copycat incidents

In popular culture
A video game called Super Columbine Massacre RPG! was based on the massacre.

The 2016 biographical film I'm Not Ashamed, based on the journals of Rachel Scott, includes alleged glimpses of Harris's and Klebold's lives and interactions with other students at Columbine High School. The 1999 black comedy, Duck! The Carbine High Massacre is inspired by the Columbine massacre. The 2003 Gus Van Sant film Elephant (which won the Palme d'Or at that year's Cannes Film Festival) depicts a fictional school shooting, but is based in part on the Columbine massacre. The 2003 Ben Coccio film Zero Day was also based on the massacre.

The 2005 Lifetime film Dawn Anna is based on the struggles of Dawn Anna Townsend, whose daughter Lauren was killed in the massacre.

The first documentary on the massacre may have been the TLC documentary Lost Boys in 2000. The 2002 Michael Moore documentary film Bowling for Columbine, which explores the massacre in the context of American gun culture, won several awards including the Academy Award for Best Documentary Feature. Also in 2002, A&E made "Columbine: Understanding Why".

Rapper Eminem references the shooting multiple times throughout his discography. Most famously, "I'm Back" off of The Marshall Mathers LP (2000) contained a line about Columbine that was censored. He references this censorship in "Rap God" (The Marshall Mathers LP 2, 2013) and repeats the line, saying it will not be censored this time because he was not as famous as when "I'm Back" was released.

Fred Durst references the Columbine shooting in the Limp Bizkit song "Head for the Barricade", which is on the 2003 album Results May Vary, and the reference was not censored on the explicit or edited versions of the album.

In 2004, the shooting was dramatized in the documentary Zero Hour, narrated by David Morrissey. In 2007, the massacre was documented in an episode of the National Geographic Channel documentary series The Final Report.

The 2009 film April Showers, which was written and directed by Andrew Robinson, who was a senior at Columbine High School during the shooting, was based on Columbine. The 2013 film Kids for Cash about the kids for cash scandal detail it as part of the "zero-tolerance" policy in the wake of the Columbine shootings.

Columbine students, Jonathan and Stephen Cohen wrote a song called "Friend of Mine (Columbine)", which briefly received airplay in the US after being performed at a memorial service broadcast on USA-wide television. The song was pressed to CD, with the proceeds benefiting families affected by the massacre, and over 10,000 copies were ordered. Shortly following the release of the CD single, the song was also featured on the Lullaby for Columbine CD.

Since the advent of online social media, a fandom for shooters Harris and Klebold has had a documented presence on social media sites, especially Tumblr. Fans of Harris and Klebold refer to themselves as "Columbiners." An article published in 2015 in the Journal of Transformative Works, a scholarly journal which focuses on the sociology of fandoms, noted that Columbiners were not fundamentally functionally different from more mainstream fandoms. Columbiners create fan art and fan fiction, and have a scholarly interest in the shooting.

References

 
Criminology
Counterterrorism in the United States